St Dionis Mission Hall is a Grade II listed church hall at 18a Parsons Green, London, SW6 4UH.

St Dionis Mission Hall was built in 1876, and the architect was Arthur Billing.

References

Buildings and structures in the London Borough of Hammersmith and Fulham
Grade II listed churches in London
Churches completed in 1876
Gothic Revival architecture in London